"1 Step Forward, 3 Steps Back" (stylized in all lowercase) is a song written and recorded by American singer-songwriter Olivia Rodrigo. It is the fourth track on her debut studio album, Sour, which was released on May 21, 2021, via Geffen Records. Dan Nigro produced the song. Taylor Swift and Jack Antonoff also received songwriting credits for its interpolation of Swift's 2017 song "New Year's Day".

The song's lyrics describe the harmful effects of inconsistent communication on a romantic relationship. Musically, "1 Step Forward, 3 Steps Back" is a tender downtempo ballad driven by a damp piano and subtle bass. Upon Sour release, "1 Step Forward, 3 Steps Back" received positive comments from music critics, who complimented its simplistic instrumentation and vulnerable lyrics. Commercially, the song reached the top 20 in Australia, Canada, Singapore, and the United States, and the top 30 in New Zealand and Portugal.

Background and release 

Following the viral success of her debut single "Drivers License", on April 13, 2021, Rodrigo announced the title, track listing and cover artwork of her debut studio album, Sour; the fourth track was titled "1 Step Forward, 3 Steps Back". On May 20, 2021, the personnel involved in the album were revealed on digital music platforms, in which Taylor Swift and Jack Antonoff were credited as songwriters on "1 Step Forward, 3 Steps Back". Rolling Stone reported that the song interpolates Swift's 2017 song "New Year's Day", which was written by Swift and Antonoff. Rodrigo has cited Swift as her biggest music inspiration and one of the core influences on Sour. The album was released on May 21, 2021, via retail stores, digital music and streaming platforms, as well as on Rodrigo's website.

Composition and recording 

"1 Step Forward, 3 Steps Back" details the impact of inconsistent and unhealthy communication on a relationship, and the subject's mixed responses via text messages. It is a ballad led by a dampened piano with a descending chord progression. The song interpolates the piano chords from Swift's "New Year's Day", the final track of her sixth studio album, Reputation (2017). Rodrigo stated that she had the verse and chorus of "1 Step Forward, 3 Steps Back", and decided to play it over the chords of "New Year's Day", which she thought were "beautiful". The song is set in the key of D major with a slow tempo of 56 beats per minute. Rodrigo's vocals span from A3 to B4. She created the song's hook from a text message, stating that she "thought it would be a cool way to describe this toxic, sort of manipulative relationship". The bird chirping heard at the beginning of the track was an idea by Dan Nigro, the song's producer and Rodrigo's musical collaborator on Sour, who recorded them through a window at his house. The song's title is inspired by the phrase "1 steps forward and 2 steps back", but replaces the 2 with 3, which has been associated with Swift's lucky number 13.

Critical reception 
Maura Johnston of Entertainment Weekly called the song a "regret-wracked" tune. The A.V. Club critic Tatiana Tenreyro wrote that "1 Step Forward, 3 Steps Back" blends Swift's influences with that of Regina Spektor, "inviting listeners who may have mourned failed romances while listening to Begin To Hope to feel nostalgic, while also allowing a new generation of teenagers to recognize themselves". Tenreyro added that the track "seamlessly transitions" into "Deja Vu", the succeeding track on Sour. NME Rhian Daly said that "1 Step Forward, 3 Steps Back" is a "perfectly fine song" but leaves "little impression" due to its location between Rodrigo's familiar singles "Drivers License" and "Deja Vu".

Writing for The New York Times, Jon Caramanica asserted that the song, like its fellow tracks, perfects "the precise language for an imprecise, complex emotional situation; and working through private stories in public fashion." Pitchfork Olivia Horn identified the song's "Swiftian" songwriting, in which Rodrigo "treats emotional turmoil like jet fuel, and laces her lyrics with specifics". Horn labelled it "dewy-eyed soft balladry à la Ingrid Michaelson". Chris DeVille, reviewing for Stereogum, said that "1 Step Forward, 3 Steps Forward" depicts "the strength of Rodrigo's conviction and her ability to condense universal frustrations into soundbites." Billboard writer Larisha Paul lauded the song's mature and confessional lyricism.

Commercial performance 
Following the release of Sour, all of the album's 11 tracks debuted on the Billboard Global 200, U.S. Hot 100, Canadian Hot 100, and Australian Singles charts, simultaneously. "1 Step Forward, 3 Steps Back" entered the Global 200 at number 17. It landed at numbers 17, 18 and 19 in Canada, Australia, and the United States, respectively. The song also reached numbers 26 and 28 in New Zealand and Portugal, respectively.

Credits and personnel
Credits adapted from the liner notes of Sour.

Recording
 Recorded at Amusement Studios (Los Angeles)
 Mixed at SOTA Studios (Los Angeles)
 Mastered at Sterling Sound (New York City)

Personnel

 Olivia Rodrigo – vocals, backing vocals, songwriter, co-producer, piano
 Daniel Nigro – producer, recording engineer, organ, bass
 Taylor Swift – songwriter
 Jack Antonoff – songwriter
 Dan Viafore – assistant engineer
 Mitch McCarthy – mixing engineer 
 Randy Merrill – mastering engineer

Charts

Certifications

References

2020s ballads
2021 songs
Olivia Rodrigo songs
Songs written by Olivia Rodrigo
Songs written by Taylor Swift
Songs written by Jack Antonoff
Song recordings produced by Dan Nigro